Theresa Greenfield (born October 20, 1963) is an American businesswoman and political candidate. She was the Democratic nominee for the 2020 United States Senate election in Iowa, losing to incumbent Republican Joni Ernst.

On November 18, 2021, Greenfield was appointed USDA Rural Development director for Iowa.

Early life and education 
Greenfield was born and raised in Bricelyn, Minnesota, a small city near the Iowa–Minnesota border. She was one of five children. Her parents raised hogs and grew crops on a small farm, and her father was also a crop dusting pilot. She helped with farm jobs such as driving tractors and grain trucks, bailing hay, and feeding hogs; and by the age of 16, assisted in negotiating contract terms and demarcating fields for the family crop-dusting business.

Greenfield took courses at Iowa Lakes Community College and Iowa State University before graduating from Minnesota State University, Mankato in 1987 with a bachelor's degree in design and human development.

Business career 
After graduating from Minnesota State, Greenfield worked as an urban planner and later began working in real estate development.

In 2005, Greenfield took a position at the home building company Rottlund Homes in Roseville, Minnesota, where she was named president of the Iowa division in 2007. In 2012, she became president of the Des Moines commercial real estate firm Colby Interests, based in Windsor Heights, Iowa. She is a member of the board of the American Institute of Certified Planners, Commercial Real Estate Women of Iowa, and the Windsor Heights Chamber of Commerce.

Political campaigns

2018 U.S. House election 

In July 2017, Greenfield announced her candidacy for the 2018 Democratic nomination in Iowa's 3rd congressional district. As a female Democratic candidate in 2018, she was featured on the cover of Time along with other female candidates, who were collectively labeled "The Avengers".

She withdrew from the race in March 2018 after learning her campaign manager had falsified some of the 1,790 required signatures to qualify her for the ballot. Her campaign tried to collect a new set of signatures in the 24 hours before the filing deadline, but was only able to acquire 1,592 valid signatures.

2020 U.S. Senate election

On June 3, 2019, Greenfield declared her candidacy for the Senate seat held by first-term Senator Joni Ernst.
On June 2, 2020, she won the Democratic primary with 47.71% of the vote, defeating three other major candidates, including Michael T. Franken, a retired U.S. Navy admiral and former aide to U.S. Senator Ted Kennedy.

Polls conducted after the primary showed a close contest between Greenfield and Ernst. In early September, political handicappers The Cook Political Report and Sabato's Crystal Ball rated the race as a toss-up. Major media described the race as one of the most likely to decide control of the Senate after the 2020 election. Through June 30, 2020, Greenfield had raised $11.5 million, compared to $14.6 million for Ernst. In the third fundraising quarter, Greenfield's campaign raised $28.7 million, more than any Senate candidate in Iowa history. As of October 2020, the race was expected to be the most expensive in the state's history, and the second most expensive Senate race in the United States, after the 2020 United States Senate election in North Carolina.

Greenfield received endorsements from former President Barack Obama, Minnesota Senator Amy Klobuchar, Massachusetts Senator Elizabeth Warren, Representative Abby Finkenauer, Representative Dave Loebsack, former Iowa first lady and education advocate Christie Vilsack, and former Lieutenant Governor of Iowa Sally Pederson. She was endorsed by organizations including the Iowa AFL-CIO, Iowa IBEW State Conference, EMILY's List, End Citizens United, and Giffords.

In the general election on November 3, 2020, she was defeated by incumbent Ernst, winning only 8 of the state's 99 counties and an estimated 7 points behind the incumbent. Greenfield conceded the race in a speech that night and on her Twitter account the following day.

Department of Agriculture 

In 2021, president Joe Biden appointed Greenfield as Iowa director for the U.S. Department of Agriculture's Rural Development program. Greenfield works under U.S. Secretary of Agriculture Tom Vilsack, a former Governor of Iowa.

Political positions

Healthcare 
Greenfield is in favor of the Affordable Care Act and expanding
Medicaid. She has supported a public option for health insurance coverage, but does not support Medicare for All. She supports paid sick leave for all workers. She also supports abortion rights.

She has called for further federal stimulus to combat the COVID-19 pandemic in the United States, including direct payments to individuals, extending expanded unemployment benefits, and expanded Paycheck Protection Program payments for small businesses. She also called for a statewide mask mandate to alleviate the spread of the COVID-19 virus.

Social safety nets 
She supports Social Security and other safety net policies, and has referred to her personal experience as part of her reasons for this.

Campaign finance reform 
Greenfield supports campaign finance reform and supports the overturning of Citizens United v. FEC, a Supreme Court decision that prohibits the government from restricting independent expenditures for political communications by corporations.  She proposed a ban on corporate Political Action Committee money, passing lobbying reforms, and overturning the Supreme Court's decision on Citizens United. She supports the Stop Swaps, Protect Local Jobs Act.

Environment 
She understands the scientific consensus on climate change, and the need for federal action, linking the climate change to the August 2020 Midwest derecho which caused flooding in Iowa, and has criticized Senator Joni Ernst for taking money from the oil industry and for denying the scientific consensus on climate change.

Personal life 
In 1985, Greenfield married Rodney Wirtjes, an electrician, who served as a journeyman lineworker and a member of the International Brotherhood of Electrical Workers. They settled in Buffalo Center, Iowa. In 1988, Wirtjes was killed in a work accident. At the time Greenfield was 24 years old, with a one-year-old son, and was pregnant with her second son who was born five months later. She credits Social Security, workers' compensation, and family support with helping her during that time.

Greenfield later married Steve Miller, with whom she had two more children. Their youngest son, Dane, is a member of the United States Army.

Electoral history

References

External links 

 Campaign website

 

Living people
1963 births
People from Faribault County, Minnesota
Businesspeople from Des Moines, Iowa
Minnesota State University, Mankato alumni
Iowa Democrats
Businesspeople from Minnesota
Women in Iowa politics
Candidates in the 2018 United States elections
Candidates in the 2020 United States Senate elections
21st-century American women politicians
21st-century American businesspeople
21st-century American businesswomen
American real estate businesspeople
21st-century American politicians